Altavilla Irpina is a town and comune in the province of Avellino, Campania, southern Italy.

History
According to some scholars, it would coincide with the Poetilia mentioned by Vergil in his Aeneid. The town had subsequently the names of Scandiano, Altacoda, Altacauda, sino until the current, deriving from the Norman Hauteville family.

Transportation
It has a station on the Avellino-Benevento railway line.

Distances

References

Cities and towns in Campania